Molzahn is a surname. Notable people with the surname include: 

Alexander Molzahn (1907–1998), German cellist and university teacher
Johannes Molzahn (1892–1965), German artist
Tenley Molzahn (born 1984), American dancer and television personality